Coombe is a settlement in Cornwall, England, United Kingdom. It is situated one mile (1.6 km) southwest of Liskeard.

Coombe Junction Halt is a station and railway junction on the Looe Valley Line railway which runs from Liskeard station to Looe station.

References

Hamlets in Cornwall
Liskeard